Rudi River may refer to:

 Rudi River (Nepal), a left tributary of the Madi River in Nepal
 Rudi (river), a right tributary of the Pârâul Galben in Romania